Zürner is a German surname. Notable people with the surname include:

Adam Friedrich Zürner (1679–1742), German cartographer and geographer
Albert Zürner (1890–1920), German diver

See also
Turner (surname)
Zerner

German-language surnames